Branchierpeton is an extinct genus of dissorophoidean euskelian temnospondyl within the family Micromelerpetontidae native to Africa.

See also
 List of prehistoric amphibians

References 

Dissorophoids
Prehistoric amphibian genera